The Spring League of American Football (SLAF) is a planned professional American football league. The league was first announced in September 2016 with an expected 10 teams with the first season starting in 2018, but as the starting date approached the league was still looking for an investment of $100 million, thus pushing its first season with eight teams back to 2019 or 2020.

The SLAF executives team consists of former Madison Square Garden (MSG) executive Michael Lardner and MSG Chief Financial Officer Robert Pollichino. According to the league management, they would like to create a relationship with the NFL as some sort of a developmental minor league.

As of October 2018, the league trademarks are "Dead/Abandoned".

Premise
The league would split the country into 10 zones for the franchise based in the zone which would draw player from the colleges and high schools in the zone to have ready rivalries (players must have their college eligibility expired to try out). Team owners would be able to place their team anywhere in the zone, and the season would run from April to July for 10 games plus playoffs.

Rules
The SLAF will play by rules of the National Football League, including having 11 players on the field and needing two feet inbounds on receptions. The lone exception would be overtime rule for which they will use college overtime rule instead of the NFL's.

Zones

References

2016 establishments in the United States
Sports leagues established in 2016
American football leagues in the United States
Professional sports leagues in the United States